The Bailey House is a historic site in Fernandina Beach, Florida. It was built about 1895 and is located at 28 South 7th Street. On June 4, 1973, it was added to the U.S. National Register of Historic Places.

The house was built by or for Mr. E.W. Bailey.  It was designed by the firm of architect George Franklin Barber and is Late Victorian in style.

The house is built of yellow heart pine and rests on brick piers.  It has three-story turreted bays at the two corners of its front facade. It has wide-eaved porches on its south and east sides.  It It has fish-scale shingles covering its gables, its front dormer, and part of the larger turret.

See also
List of George Franklin Barber works

References

External links
 

Houses on the National Register of Historic Places in Florida
Houses in Nassau County, Florida
National Register of Historic Places in Nassau County, Florida
Houses completed in 1895
Victorian architecture in Florida
Fernandina Beach, Florida
1890s establishments in Florida